John Bickley may refer to:

John Bickley (cricketer) (1819–1866), English cricketer
John Bickley (Huntingdon MP), English Member of Parliament for Huntingdon in the 15th century
John Bickley (Stafford MP), English Member of Parliament for Stafford in the 16th century